Taean Hwamul station is a freight-only railway station located in Sep'o-ri, Taean-guyŏk, Namp'o-t'ŭkpyŏlsi, North Korea; it is the terminus station of the Taean Line of the Korean State Railway.

The station spur tracks serving the Taean Machine Complex, the Taean Electric Factory, and the Taean Friendship Glass Factory.

History
The station was originally opened by the Chosen Government Railway.

References

Railway stations in North Korea